Lélio, ou Le retour à la vie (English: Lélio, or the Return to Life) Op. 14b, is a work incorporating music and spoken text by the French composer Hector Berlioz, intended as a sequel to his Symphonie fantastique.  It is written for a narrator, solo tenor and baritone, mixed chorus, and an orchestra including piano.

It was composed in Italy in 1831, often using previously written music, and first performed at the Conservatoire de Paris on 9 December 1832 as Le retour à la vie, mélologue en six parties. It was revised for a performance in Weimar at the request of Franz Liszt in 1855 and published the following year. According to David Cairns, Lélio had the most "immediate impact" of all Berlioz's works, yet the fashionable Romantic features and the mixture of declamation and music which appealed to early audiences have served to date the piece and it is rarely revived or recorded nowadays.

Overview 

Lélio is a kind of sequel to Symphonie fantastique and makes use of the famous idée fixe (the recurring musical theme symbolising the beloved) from that work. Both the symphony and Lélio were inspired by the composer's unhappy love affairs, the symphony by Harriet Smithson, Lélio by Marie Moke, who had broken off her engagement to Berlioz in order to marry Camille Pleyel, prompting the composer to contemplate suicide. Lélio is a record of the composer overcoming his despair and "returning to life" via the consolations of music and literature. Berlioz later revised his intentions, making it seem as if both the symphony and Lélio were about Harriet Smithson (she later became his wife). The symphony uses programme music to describe a despairing artist trying to kill himself with an overdose of opium, leading to a series of increasingly terrifying visions. The programme of Lélio describes the artist wakening from these dreams, musing on William Shakespeare, his sad life, and not having a woman. He decides that if he can't put this unrequited love out of his head, he will immerse himself in music. He then leads an orchestra to a successful performance of one of his new compositions and the story ends peacefully.

Lélio consists of six musical pieces presented by an actor who stands on stage in front of a curtain concealing the orchestra, chorus and solo singers. The actor's dramatic monologues explain the meaning of the music in the life of the artist. The work begins and ends with the idée fixe theme, linking Lélio to the Symphonie fantastique.

The music
The six pieces of music are:

Instrumentation: 2 flutes (2nd also piccolo), 2 oboes (2nd also English horn), 2 clarinets, 4 bassoons 4 horns, 2 trumpets, 2 cornets, 3 trombones, ophicleide, timpani, bass drum, tam-tam, harp, piano (2 and 4 hand), strings

Recordings
 Lambert Wilson (narrator), Orchestre Symphonique de Montréal, conducted by Charles Dutoit (Decca)
 Orchestre National de l'ORTF, conducted by Jean Martinon (EMI)
 Pierre Boulez Conducts Berlioz: Symphonie fantastique and Lélio
 London Symphony Orchestra, conducted by Pierre Boulez; recording in public domain
 Depardieu, Zeffiri, Ketelsen, CSO, Muti; recorded in 2010, released in 2015
 Jean-Philippe Lafont (narrator), Cyrille Dubois (tenor), Florian Sempey (baritone), Vienna Symphony, conducted by Philippe Jordan; recorded in 2018, released in 2019 (Sony)

Sources
David Cairns: Berlioz: The Making of an Artist (the first volume of his biography of the composer) (André Deutsch, 1989)
Hugh Macdonald: Berlioz ("The Master Musicians", J.M.Dent, 1982)
Berlioz: Memoirs (Dover, 1960)
Booklet notes to the Dutoit recording

External links
Complete text of Lélio

Compositions by Hector Berlioz
1831 compositions
Compositions with a narrator
Choral compositions
Compositions for symphony orchestra